This is a round-up of the 1999 Sligo Senior Football Championship. Tourlestrane regained the Owen B. Hunt Cup in this year after defeating Easkey, making their first final appearance since 1968. The group stages were re-introduced for this year, but with only three groups used, this resulted in a complicated series of playoffs to determine the final semi-final spot. Tubbercurry, having been disqualified after failing to field against Shamrock Gaels in a playoff, but then re-instated, won that last spot, but Tourlestrane then ended their ambitions in the semi-final.

Group stages

The Championship was contested by 12 teams, divided into three groups of four. The top side in each group qualified for the semi-finals, with the runners-up playing off to decide the other semi-finalist.

Group A

Group B

Group C

Playoffs

Semi-finals

Sligo Senior Football Championship Final

References 

 Sligo Champion (July–October 1999)

Sligo Senior Football Championship
Sligo Senior Football Championship